Valparaiso Sporting (formerly known as Valparaiso Sporting Club), commonly known as the Sporting, is a thoroughbred flat horse race track in Viña del Mar, Valparaíso Region, Chile.

History 
Valparaiso Sporting Club was founded in 1882 by members of mostly British origin. Since 1885, it is the site of the Chilean Derby, with very high attendances during its day.

In 1920, Valparaiso Sporting Club was also the site of the South American Championship (soccer) final.

Physical attributes 
Races are conducted on two left-handed courses, one turf (about 2000 meters long) and one dirt (about 1900 meters long).

Racing 
Purses at the Sporting are lower than at the two Greater Santiago tracks, Hipodromo Chile and Club Hipico de Santiago, but considerably higher than at the provincial tracks Club Hipico de Concepcion and Club Hipico de Antofagasta. Several prestigious stakes races are run at Valparaiso.

External links
 Home Page

Horse racing venues in Chile
Copa América stadiums
Sports venues in Valparaíso Region